Marc Hoffmann (born August 1, 1973) is a German sex offender and murderer. It was in June 2005 that he was sentenced to life imprisonment with subsequent preventative detention for the sexual abuse and murder of two children. In addition, it can not be completely ruled out that Hoffmann is possibly responsible for more, until today unresolved sexual offenses and murders.

Life

Childhood and Youth 
Marc Hoffmann was born the son of a former sailor and a nurse in Plettenberg in the Sauerland. He first grew up as an only child in Plettenberg, before his family relocated to the small village of Nuttmecke near Attendorn in 1980, where he and his parents lived in a shared home with his grandparents.

Hoffmann was teased during his school years due to his strong preponderance, his bow-legs and a speech disorder rendering him an outsider.

After completing elementary school, Hoffmann attended secondary school. His academic achievements were below average, which is why he had to repeat a grade in both elementary and secondary school. At the age of 16, Hoffmann dropped out of secondary school after completing the eighth grade.

Adulthood 
Hoffmann was unemployed for three years after leaving school, and from 1992 onwards worked as a warden at the Attendorner Bauhof (a construction yard) for eleven months. Hoffmann spent his spare time increasingly playing first-person shooters, at this time also developing a fondness for violence and horror films. Hoffmann soon discovered his sexually sadistic inclinations and began to torment and kill frogs and mice that he himself caught.

In 1993, Hoffmann did his military service with the Bundeswehr. After completing his service he returned to Nuttmecke, where he was temporarily active in the local Neo-Nazi scene, but only remained a Mitläufer. At the age of 20 he had a relationship with a young woman from a neighbouring town, who brought a certificate showing that they had a daughter in 1994.

Attempted rape and indictments

In February 1994, Hoffmann first emerged as a sex offender when he wanted to rape a 17-year-old hitchhiker in a remote forest. Because Hoffmann was a confessor and also had no previous criminal record, he was in the course of a subsequent lawsuit a "positive social prediction" was certified, so that the two-year prison sentence was suspended. His girlfriend, however, separated from him as a result.

In 1995, Hoffmann moved from Nuttmecke to Bremerhaven together with his parents, grandparents and daughter. Shortly after the move, however, his father died of Creutzfeldt-Jakob disease. After his father's death Hoffmann began training as a plumber, but after failing the final exam twice he dropped out of training. After he worked for the German Red Cross as a paramedic at major events for five years, he met his future wife, whom he soon married.

From the year 2000 Hoffmann worked for a security company in Bremerhaven, where he regulated bus tickets. During this time, he was again accused of raping a 17-year-old, whom he had met while working. This trial was discontinued for lack of evidence.

In 2002, his wife gave birth to a daughter. The marriage was in crisis because his wife suspected him of unfaithfulness. Hoffmann had a passion for driving aimlessly over long distances, presumably to relieve emotional tensions. Therefore, his wife increasingly complained about the monthly high spending of gasoline. She also suspected her husband of regularly visiting Bremerhaven's "baby street".

In June 2003, Hoffmann lost his job with the Bremerhaven security company and was unemployed from then on, which further increased his aimless driving around. His wife separated from him in the spring of 2004 and moved out of the apartment with their daughter, while Hoffmann stayed there with his older daughter.

Murders 
On May 6, 2004, Hoffmann was in the Cuxhaven district of Altenwalde when he happened to meet 8-year-old Levke S., who was waiting outside her parents' house, as he wheeled aimlessly around in his car. He lured the girl into his car with false promises and carried her to a wooden area where he sexually abused the child and then strangled her with a zip tie. After the murder, Hoffmann searched for a place to hide the corpse several times before choosing the immediate vicinity of his hometown. The now skeletonized body of Levke was discovered in late August 2004 by a mushroom collector. Undeterred by the massive manhunt for Levke's murderer, Hoffmann apparently continued the search for new victims. On October 30, 2004, during one of his aimless tours, he met 8-year-old Felix W. from Ebersdorf, Rotenburg, who was riding his bicycle. Similar to Levke, Hoffmann lured the boy into his car and drove to a nearby forest. After waiting for the onset of darkness, Hoffmann abused and then strangled the boy with his bare hands, throwing the body into the Geeste river at Bremerhaven. The corpse was found on January 7, 2005, after a note from Hoffmann, who had been arrested, surfaced.  Hoffman had confessed that he "tied up him as a package" and thrown his body into the river.

Arrest, trial and condemnation 
Hoffmann was arrested on the evening of December 8, 2004 in connection with the murders of Levke and Felix. On the same day he confessed to the murder of Levke. On January 7, 2005, he also confessed to Felix's murder to his lawyers. On May 9, 2005, the lawsuit against Hoffmann was opened in the Stade district court.

The family of Levke appeared in the trial as co-plaintiffs. Hoffmann remained silent during the whole process, and all statements on his part were read by his lawyers.

On June 29, 2005, the Stade County Court sentenced Hoffmann to life imprisonment for the sexual abuse and murder of the two children. In addition, a particular severity of debt was determined, for which Hoffmann was also ordered preventative detention. Thus, it is possible that Hoffmann may never leave prison again.

The chairman of the assizes, Berend Appelkamp, justified the verdict that Hoffmann "inflicted unimaginable suffering" on others. Hoffmann accepted the verdict without apparent emotion.

Hoffmann is currently serving his life sentence in the Oldenburg prison.

Personality 
The witnesses resolutely described his mother as someone who should have taken better care of him, and Hoffmann was considered a mama's boy. Contemporary witnesses described him as an intelligent "grobian" (boorish individual) with little empathy.

With regard to his sexual experiences, Hoffmann was regarded as a "late bloomer", especially since in his teens, unlike his peers, he was hardly able to establish ties to the opposite sex. The fact that Hoffmann was born with only one testicle was certainly a major reason for his inhibitions. In this context, he increasingly consumed pornography as a teenager.

In the course of his psychiatric exam, Hoffmann was classified as "not mentally ill" and therefore could not apply for the insanity defense. According to these reports, he was neither sadistic nor a pedophile. In this regard, the reviewers came to the realization that Hoffmann merely saw the children as simple sacrifices, and that he was attested for a "massive lack of emotionality and compassion".

Possible other crimes 
With regard to other possible crimes, the murder of 10-year-old Adelina in Bremen in June 2001, which remains unsolved, has been and is still considered. However, he allegedly has confessed to the murder to a cellmate.

Furthermore, Hoffmann also allegedly confessed to a fellow prisoner to six more sexually motivated murders. According to media reports, this is supposed to refer to two children killed in East Germany, two hitchhikers and two older women. Although he did in fact tell his cellmate this, Hoffmann claims it was all fictitious.

Even the for-many-years unexplained murder of 8-year-old Johanna from Hesse, who disappeared on September 2, 1999, is sometimes associated with Hoffmann. The body was found seven months later. On October 26, 2017, it was announced that a partly-confessed suspect had been arrested for her murder, and thus Hoffmann was eliminated as a suspect.

During his remand, Hoffmann allegedly hinted to officials about the murder of an old woman in his home village. Because in 1994 an 86-year-old woman disappeared without a trace, Hoffmann is considered associated with this case.

Hoffmann was also increasingly associated with the so-called Schullandheim murders, which remained unexplained for a long time. These, however, were found to be the work of another sex offender.

While imprisoned in the Oldenburg prison, Hoffmann allegedly confessed to an informant to the rape of two women.

Police allegations 
According to the police officers, Hoffmann was considered a special criminal due to choosing both girls and boys as victims.

The investigating authorities in the murder cases of Levke and Felix were accused, after Hoffmann's capture, of ignoring evidence. Seven weeks before Felix's murder, evidence of Hoffmann's alleged perpetration in the Levke case became available. However, corresponding testimonies were viewed as insufficient, and the police continued to reject such claims.

In May 2010, the former special commissioner for the Levke case, Günter König-Kruse, admitted to the Nordsee-Zeitung that on June 13, 16, and 29, Hoffmann had returned to the parking lot where he had thrown away Levke's satchel and jacket, where he was filmed by video cameras positioned by the police. This was around four months before Felix's disappearance. However, because the video recordings did not come to a police file until November 29, about three weeks after Felix's death, nothing could be done. In addition, a longtime acquaintance of Hoffmann's, a police officer who was present and was faced with suspicions that Hoffmann could indeed be Levke's murderer. The next day she made an official statement to the police, especially after confessing to knowing about Hoffmann's criminal record for rape.

See also
 List of German serial killers

References

External links 
Uwe Ruprecht: Child trap on the move

1973 births
2004 murders in Germany
German murderers
German murderers of children
German rapists
Living people
Prisoners sentenced to life imprisonment by Germany
Suspected serial killers